Cymindis ruficollis is a species of ground beetle in the subfamily Harpalinae. It was described by Gebler in 1845.

References

ruficollis
Beetles described in 1845